Khine Hnin Wai (born on 14 March 1981) is a  Burmese actress, philanthropist, and an activist for victims of child rape. She is considered one of the most successful actresses in Burmese cinema and best known for her charitable activities work in Myanmar and as the founder of the Khine Hnin Wai Foundation, a charity that supports orphanages, flood victims, and other good causes.

Khine has founded a charity organization since 2014, which is very active in several places in Myanmar.

Early life and education

Khine was born on 14 March 1981 in Myanmar.

Career
She began her career in 1999. She became popular for her role as the lead in the film, San Ye .

In 2005, she then starred in the film Kyun Ma Ka Ma Hay Thi (I'm Mistress)  alongside Pyay Ti Oo and Moe Hay Ko.

In 2018, she was cast in the drama series Tu Hnine Ma Ya Tae Myittar, alongside Nay Dway and Poe Ei Ei Khant.

Selected filmography

Film (Cinema)
San Yay (ဆန္ေရ) (1999)
 Kyoe Hpyang Chi Htar Thaw Varanasi (ျကိုးဖြင့်ချည်ထားသော ဗာရာဏသီ) 2500
Sit Ko Mone Yae Tike Khae The (စစ်ကိုမုန်း၍တိုက်ခဲ့သည်) (2018)

References

External links

Living people
1981 births
21st-century Burmese women singers
21st-century Burmese actresses